U.S. Highway 278 (US 278) runs west-east across the southern half of Arkansas for . US 278 originates at a junction with U.S. Routes 59 and 71 in the town of Wickes and exits into Mississippi on the Greenville Bridge over the Mississippi River northeast of Shives, running concurrently with US 82.

For the vast majority of its route, US 278 is two-lane and rural, with the exception of portions in and around major towns and cities. The route connects small towns throughout southern Arkansas, with Hope and Camden being the largest population center along the route. As a result of its rural routing, US 278 has just one junction with an interstate highway, being I-30 at Hope.

History
While US 278 was initially designated in 1951, it was not routed through the state of Arkansas until 1998. Up until that time, it ran to either Tupelo or a place near Amory. In 1998, it was routed to its current western terminus in Wickes, replacing a vast majority of Arkansas Highway 4, which remains a distinct albeit short highway in southeastern Desha County.

Future 
US 278 is planned to be rerouted onto the proposed Charles W. Dean Bridge. It is part of the plans to build Interstate 69 in Arkansas and in Mississippi.

Major intersections

References

External links

 Arkansas
Transportation in Polk County, Arkansas
Transportation in Hempstead County, Arkansas
Transportation in Nevada County, Arkansas
Transportation in Bradley County, Arkansas
Transportation in Drew County, Arkansas
Transportation in Desha County, Arkansas
Transportation in Chicot County, Arkansas
78-2